Walter Henry Ewing (11 February 1878 – 25 June 1945) was a Canadian sport shooter who competed at the 1908 Summer Olympics. In the 1908 Olympics he won a gold medal in the individual trap shooting event and silver medal in team trap shooting event.

References

External links
Walter Ewing's profile at databaseOlympics

1878 births
1945 deaths
Sportspeople from Montreal
Canadian male sport shooters
Olympic shooters of Canada
Shooters at the 1908 Summer Olympics
Olympic gold medalists for Canada
Olympic silver medalists for Canada
Olympic medalists in shooting
Medalists at the 1908 Summer Olympics
Anglophone Quebec people
20th-century Canadian people